Teenage Euthanasia is an American adult animated fantasy comedy television series created by Alyson Levy and Alissa Nutting. The series stars Maria Bamford, Jo Firestone, Tim Robinson and Bebe Neuwirth. The series premiered on Adult Swim on September 6, 2021.

On March 31, 2022, it was announced the series has been renewed for a second season.

Plot
In the mildly apocalyptic near future, Trophy Fantasy is a teenage mother who left her baby daughter Euthanasia "Annie" Fantasy in the custody of her undertaker mother Baba and her half-brother Pete at their funeral home Tender Endings in the fictional town of Fort Gator, Florida. After getting a devastating divorce from her current husband and dying from an overdose 15 years later, Trophy's corpse is delivered to Baba at Tender Endings as her written demand to those who found her dead. An unexpected combination of Baba's embalming fluid, Annie's tears, and a lightning bolt from a thunderstorm revives Trophy as a sentient zombie with supernatural abilities that involves housing a swarm of sentient beetles in her crotch.

Each episode ends with a post-credits stinger.

Cast
 Maria Bamford as Trophy Fantasy 
 Jo Firestone as Euthanasia "Annie" Fantasy
 Tim Robinson as Uncle Pete
 Bebe Neuwirth as Baba

Additional voices
 Scott Adsit
 Ozioma Akagha
 Philip Anthony-Rodriguez
 Sandra Bauleo
 H. Jon Benjamin
 Kallee Brookes
 Aidy Bryant
 Tiana Camacho
 Jordan Carlos
 Tony Cavalero
 Vernon Chatman
 Christi Chiello
 Stephen Colbert
 David Cross
 Natasia Demetriou
 Loretta Devine
 Cole Escola
 Leo Fitzpatrick
 John Gemberling
 Jon Glaser
 Illana Glazer
 Kimiko Glenn
 Harvey Guillén
 Ashleigh Crystal Hairston
 Bonita Hamilton
 Jerome Harmann-Hardeman
 Patti Harrison
 Orlando Jones
 Kody Kavitha
 Christopher Knowings
 Violet Krumbein
 Heather Lawless
 John Lee
 Mela Lee
 Phaedra Lee
 Sookie Lee
 Alyson Levy
 Neil Magnuson
 Max Malas
 Taryn Manning
 Anthony Lee Medina
 Lily D. Moore
 Misty Monroe
 Reed Northup 
 Alissa Nutting
 Conner O'Malley
 Patton Oswalt
 Edi Patterson
 Lorelei Ramirez
 Bumper Robinson
 William Salyers
 Kristen Schaal as Norma the Crotch Beetle (in "Adventures in Beetle Sitting")
 Joseph Sikora
 Ben Sinclair
 Corin Wells
 Cesili Williams
 CJ Wilson

Episodes

Notes

References

External links
 

2021 American television series debuts
2020s American adult animated television series
2020s American animated comedy television series
2020s American black comedy television series
2020s American sitcoms
American adult animated comedy television series
American adult animated fantasy television series
American animated sitcoms
American flash adult animated television series
Fiction about resurrection
English-language television shows
Adult Swim original programming
Teen animated television series
Television series by PFFR
Television series by Williams Street
Television shows set in Florida
Television series set in the future
Zombies in television